"I'm Not Gonna Let You" (also titled "I'm Not Gonna Let") is a single by Colonel Abrams, released on February 7, 1986 from his self-titled debut album, Colonel Abrams (1985).  It was his third number one on the U.S. dance chart and second top 20 hit on the U.S. R&B singles chart. In the UK, "I'm Not Gonna Let You" reached number 24 on the UK Singles Chart.

Track listing 

7": MCA / 1031 United Kingdom
 "I'm Not Gonna Let You" - 3:02
 "I'm Not Gonna Let You" (Percapella Mix) - 4:56

7": MCA / 52773 United States
 "I'm Not Gonna Let You" (Radio Edit) - 3:47
 "I'm Not Gonna Let You" (Instrumental) - 4:58

12": MCA / X1031 United Kingdom
 "I'm Not Gonna Let You" (Extended Version) - 6:56 
 "I'm Not Gonna Let You" (Dub) - 5:46
 "Trapped" (Extended Version) - 6:30
 "I'm Not Gonna Let You" (Percappella Mix) - 4:56

12": MCA / 23612 United States
 "I'm Not Gonna Let" (Extended Version) - 6:56 
 "I'm Not Gonna Let" (Radio Edit) - 3:51 
 "I'm Not Gonna Let" (Dub) - 5:46 
 "I'm Not Gonna Let" (A Cappella) - 3:46

 Remixes by Timmy Regisford

Charts

References

External links
 

1985 songs
1986 singles
Song recordings produced by Richard James Burgess
Colonel Abrams songs
MCA Records singles